Porcellionides apulicus is a woodlouse that is endemic to Italy.

References

Porcellionidae
Crustaceans described in 1932
Endemic arthropods of Italy
Woodlice of Europe